Radoši may refer to:

Radoši, Tomislavgrad, a village in Bosnia and Herzegovina
Radoši, Metlika, a village in Slovenia
 Radoşi, a village in Crasna Commune, Gorj County, Romania

Serbo-Croatian place names